Trinity was the code name of the first detonation of a nuclear weapon. It was conducted by the United States Army at 5:29 a.m. on July 16, 1945, as part of the Manhattan Project. The only structures originally in the vicinity were the McDonald Ranch House and its ancillary buildings, which scientists used as a laboratory for testing bomb components. A base camp was constructed, and there were 425 people present on the weekend of the test.

The code name "Trinity" was assigned by J. Robert Oppenheimer, the director of the Los Alamos Laboratory, inspired by the poetry of John Donne. The test was of an implosion-design plutonium device, informally nicknamed "The Gadget", of the same design as the Fat Man bomb later detonated over Nagasaki, Japan, on August 9, 1945. The complexity of the design required a major effort from the Los Alamos Laboratory, and concerns about whether it would work led to a decision to conduct the first nuclear test. The test was planned and directed by Kenneth Bainbridge.

Fears of a fizzle did lead to the construction of a steel containment vessel called Jumbo that could contain the plutonium, allowing it to be recovered, although ultimately this was not used in the test. Observers included Vannevar Bush, James Chadwick, James Conant, Thomas Farrell, Enrico Fermi, Hans Bethe, Richard Feynman, Leslie Groves, Robert Oppenheimer, Frank Oppenheimer, Geoffrey Taylor, Richard Tolman, Edward Teller, and John von Neumann.

The test site was declared a National Historic Landmark district in 1965, and listed on the National Register of Historic Places the following year.

Background

The creation of nuclear weapons arose from scientific and political developments of the 1930s. The decade saw many new discoveries about the nature of atoms, including the existence of nuclear fission. The concurrent rise of fascist governments in Europe led to a fear of a German nuclear weapon project, especially among scientists who were refugees from Nazi Germany and other fascist countries. When their calculations showed that nuclear weapons were theoretically feasible, the British and United States governments supported an all-out effort to build them.

These efforts were transferred to the authority of the U.S. Army in June 1942, and became the Manhattan Project. Brigadier General Leslie R. Groves, Jr. was appointed its director in September 1942. The weapons development portion of this project was located at the Los Alamos Laboratory in northern New Mexico, under the directorship of physicist J. Robert Oppenheimer. The University of Chicago, Columbia University and the Radiation Laboratory at the University of California, Berkeley conducted other development work.

Production of the fissile isotopes uranium-235 and plutonium-239 were enormous undertakings given the technology of the 1940s, and accounted for 80% of the total costs of the project. Uranium enrichment was carried out at the Clinton Engineer Works near Oak Ridge, Tennessee. Theoretically, enriching uranium was feasible through preexisting techniques, but it proved difficult to scale to industrial levels and was extremely costly. Only 0.72 percent of natural uranium is uranium-235, and it was estimated that it would take 27,000 years to produce a gram of uranium with mass spectrometers, but kilogram amounts were required.

Plutonium is a synthetic element with complicated physical, chemical and metallurgical properties. It is not found in nature in appreciable quantities. Until mid-1944, the only plutonium that had been isolated had been produced in cyclotrons in microgram amounts, whereas weapons required kilograms. In April 1944, physicist Emilio Segrè, the head of the Los Alamos Laboratory's P-5 (Radioactivity) Group, received the first sample of reactor-bred plutonium from the X-10 Graphite Reactor at Oak Ridge. He discovered that, in addition to the plutonium-239 isotope, it also contained significant amounts of plutonium-240. The Manhattan Project produced plutonium in nuclear reactors at the Hanford Engineer Works near Hanford, Washington.

The longer the plutonium remained irradiated inside a reactor—necessary for high yields of the metal—the greater the content of the plutonium-240 isotope, which undergoes spontaneous fission at thousands of times the rate of plutonium-239. The extra neutrons it released meant that there was an unacceptably high probability that plutonium in a gun-type fission weapon would detonate too soon after a critical mass was formed, producing a "fizzle"—a nuclear explosion many times smaller than a full explosion. This meant that the Thin Man bomb design that the laboratory had developed would not work properly.

The Laboratory turned to an alternative, albeit more technically difficult, design, an implosion-type nuclear weapon. In September 1943, mathematician John von Neumann had proposed a design in which a fissile core would be surrounded by two different high explosives that produced shock waves of different speeds. Alternating the faster- and slower-burning explosives in a carefully calculated configuration would produce a compressive wave upon their simultaneous detonation. This so-called "explosive lens" focused the shock waves inward with enough force to rapidly compress the plutonium core to several times its original density. This reduced the size of a critical mass, making it supercritical. It also activated a small neutron source at the center of the core, the initiator, which assured that the chain reaction began in earnest at the right moment. Such a complicated process required research and experimentation in engineering and hydrodynamics before a practical design could be developed. The entire Los Alamos Laboratory was reorganized in August 1944 to focus on the design of a workable implosion bomb.

Preparation

Decision

The idea of testing the implosion device was brought up in discussions at Los Alamos in January 1944 and attracted enough support for Oppenheimer to approach Groves. Groves gave approval, but he had concerns. The Manhattan Project had spent a great deal of money and effort to produce the plutonium, and he wanted to know whether there would be a way to recover it. The Laboratory's Governing Board then directed Norman Ramsey to investigate how this could be done. In February 1944, Ramsey proposed a small-scale test in which the explosion was limited in size by reducing the number of generations of chain reactions, and that it take place inside a sealed containment vessel from which the plutonium could be recovered.

The means of generating such a controlled reaction were uncertain, and the data obtained would not be as useful as that from a full-scale explosion. Oppenheimer argued that the "implosion gadget must be tested in a range where the energy release is comparable with that contemplated for final use." In March 1944, he obtained Groves's tentative approval for testing a full-scale explosion inside a containment vessel, although Groves was still worried about how he would explain the loss of "a billion dollars worth" of plutonium to a Senate Committee in the event of a failure.

Code name
The exact origin of the code name "Trinity" for the test is unknown, but it is often attributed to Oppenheimer as a reference to the poetry of John Donne, which in turn references the Christian belief of the Trinity (i.e. God as one being existing as three persons). In 1962, Groves wrote to Oppenheimer about the origin of the name, asking if he had chosen it because it was a name common to rivers and peaks in the West and would not attract attention, and elicited this reply:

Organization
In March 1944, planning for the test was assigned to Kenneth Bainbridge, a professor of physics at Harvard University, working under explosives expert George Kistiakowsky. Bainbridge's group was known as the E-9 (Explosives Development) Group. Stanley Kershaw, formerly from the National Safety Council, was made responsible for safety. Captain Samuel P. Davalos, the assistant post engineer at Los Alamos, was placed in charge of construction. First Lieutenant Harold C. Bush became commander of the Base Camp at Trinity. Scientists William Penney, Victor Weisskopf and Philip Moon were consultants. Eventually seven subgroups were formed:
 TR-1 (Services) under John H. Williams
 TR-2 (Shock and Blast) under John H. Manley
 TR-3 (Measurements) under Robert R. Wilson
 TR-4 (Meteorology) under J. M. Hubbard
 TR-5 (Spectrographic and Photographic) under Julian E. Mack
 TR-6 (Airborne Measurements) under Bernard Waldman
 TR-7 (Medical) under Louis H. Hempelmann

The E-9 group was renamed the X-2 (Development, Engineering and Tests) Group in the August 1944 reorganization.

Test site

Safety and security required a remote, isolated and unpopulated area. The scientists also wanted a flat area to minimize secondary effects of the blast, and with little wind to spread radioactive fallout. Eight candidate sites were considered: the Tularosa Valley; the Jornada del Muerto Valley; the area southwest of Cuba, New Mexico, and north of Thoreau; and the lava flats of the El Malpais National Monument, all in New Mexico; the San Luis Valley near the Great Sand Dunes National Monument in Colorado; the Desert Training Area and San Nicolas Island in Southern California; and the sand bars of Padre Island, Texas.

The sites were surveyed by car and by air by Bainbridge, R. W. Henderson, Major W. A. Stevens and Major Peer de Silva. The site finally chosen, after consulting with Major General Uzal Ent, the commander of the Second Air Force on September 7, 1944, lay at the northern end of the Alamogordo Bombing Range, in Socorro County near the towns of Carrizozo and San Antonio.().

Like the rest of the Alamogordo Bombing Range, it had been acquired by the government in 1942. The patented land had been condemned and grazing rights suspended. Scientists used this as a laboratory for testing bomb components. Bainbridge and Davalos drew up plans for a base camp with accommodation and facilities for 160 personnel, along with the technical infrastructure to support the test. A construction firm from Lubbock, Texas built the barracks, officers' quarters, mess hall and other basic facilities. The requirements expanded and, by July 1945, 250 people worked at the Trinity test site. On the weekend of the test, there were 425 present.

Lieutenant Bush's twelve-man MP unit arrived at the site from Los Alamos on December 30, 1944. This unit established initial security checkpoints and horse patrols. The distances around the site proved too great for the horses, so they were repurposed for polo playing, and the MPs resorted to using jeeps and trucks for transportation. Maintenance of morale among men working long hours under harsh conditions along with dangerous reptiles and insects was a challenge. Bush strove to improve the food and accommodation, and to provide organized games and nightly movies.

Throughout 1945, other personnel arrived at the Trinity Site to help prepare for the bomb test. They tried to use water out of the ranch wells, but found the water so alkaline they could not drink it. They were forced to use U.S. Navy saltwater soap and hauled drinking water in from the firehouse in Socorro. Gasoline and diesel were purchased from the Standard Oil plant there. Military and civilian construction personnel built warehouses, workshops, a magazine and commissary. The railroad siding at Pope, New Mexico, was upgraded by adding an unloading platform. Electricity was supplied by portable generators.

Due to its proximity to the bombing range, the base camp was accidentally bombed twice in May. When the lead plane on a practice night raid accidentally knocked out the generator or otherwise doused the lights illuminating their target, they went in search of the lights, and since they had not been informed of the presence of the Trinity base camp, and it was lit, bombed it instead. The accidental bombing damaged the stables and the carpentry shop, and a small fire resulted.

Jumbo

Responsibility for the design of a containment vessel for an unsuccessful explosion, known as "Jumbo", was assigned to Robert W. Henderson and Roy W. Carlson of the Los Alamos Laboratory's X-2A Section. The bomb would be placed into the heart of Jumbo, and if the bomb's detonation was unsuccessful, the outer walls of Jumbo would not be breached, making it possible to recover the bomb's plutonium. Hans Bethe, Victor Weisskopf, and Joseph O. Hirschfelder, made the initial calculations, followed by a more detailed analysis by Henderson and Carlson. After consulting with the steel companies and the railroads, Carlson produced a scaled-back cylindrical design that would be much easier to manufacture. Carlson identified a company that normally made boilers for the Navy, Babcock & Wilcox; they had made something similar and were willing to attempt its manufacture.

At the time, it was the heaviest item ever shipped by rail.

For many of the Los Alamos scientists, Jumbo was "the physical manifestation of the lowest point in the Laboratory's hopes for the success of an implosion bomb." By the time it arrived, the reactors at Hanford produced plutonium in quantity, and Oppenheimer was confident that there would be enough for a second test. The use of Jumbo would interfere with the gathering of data on the explosion, the primary objective of the test. An explosion of more than  would vaporize the steel and make it hard to measure the thermal effects. Even  would send fragments flying, presenting a hazard to personnel and measuring equipment. It was therefore decided not to use it. Instead, it was hoisted up a steel tower  from the explosion, where it could be used for a subsequent test. In the end, Jumbo survived the explosion, although its tower did not.

Jumbo was destroyed on April 16, 1946, when an Army ordnance team detonated eight 500 lb bombs in the bottom of the steel container. Jumbo, with its steel banding around the middle, had been designed specifically to contain the 5000 lbs of high explosive in Gadget while it was suspended in the center of the vessel. With the bombs sitting in the bottom of Jumbo, the resulting blast sent fragments flying in all directions as far as three quarters of a mile. Who authorized the destruction of Jumbo remains controversial. The rusting skeleton of Jumbo sits in the parking lot at the Trinity site on the White Sands Missile Range, where it was moved in 1979.

The development team also considered other methods of recovering active material in the event of a dud explosion. One idea was to cover it with a cone of sand. Another was to suspend the bomb in a tank of water. As with Jumbo, it was decided not to proceed with these means of containment either. The CM-10 (Chemistry and Metallurgy) group at Los Alamos also studied how the active material could be chemically recovered after a contained or failed explosion.

100-ton test

Because there would be only one chance to carry out the test correctly, Bainbridge decided that a rehearsal should be carried out to allow the plans and procedures to be verified, and the instrumentation to be tested and calibrated. Oppenheimer was initially skeptical but gave permission, and later agreed that it contributed to the success of the Trinity test.

Kistiakowsky assured Bainbridge that the explosives used were not susceptible to shock. This was proven correct when some boxes fell off the elevator lifting them up to the platform. Flexible tubing was threaded through the pile of boxes of explosives.

The test was scheduled for May 5 but was postponed for two days to allow for more equipment to be installed. Requests for further postponements had to be refused because they would have affected the schedule for the main test. The detonation time was set for 04:00 Mountain War Time (MWT), on May 7, but there was a 37-minute delay to allow the observation plane, a Boeing B-29 Superfortress from the 216th Army Air Forces Base Unit flown by Major Clyde "Stan" Shields, to get into position.

An electrical signal of unknown origin caused the explosion to go off 0.25 seconds early, ruining experiments that required split-second timing.

In addition to uncovering scientific and technological issues, the rehearsal test revealed practical concerns as well. Over 100 vehicles were used for the rehearsal test, but it was realized more would be required for the main test, and they would need better roads and repair facilities. More radios were required, and more telephone lines, as the telephone system had become overloaded. Lines needed to be buried to prevent damage by vehicles. A teletype was installed to allow better communication with Los Alamos. A town hall was built to allow for large conferences and briefings, and the mess hall had to be upgraded.

The Gadget

The term "gadget" was a laboratory euphemism for a bomb, from which the laboratory's weapon physics division, "G Division", took its name in August 1944. At that time it did not refer specifically to the Trinity Test device as it had yet to be developed, but once it was, it became the laboratory code name. The Trinity Gadget was officially a Y-1561 device, as was the Fat Man used a few weeks later in the bombing of Nagasaki. The two were very similar, with only minor differences, the most obvious being the absence of fuzing and the external ballistic casing. The bombs were still under development, and small changes continued to be made to the Fat Man design.

To keep the design as simple as possible, a near solid spherical core was chosen rather than a hollow one, although calculations showed that a hollow core would be more efficient in its use of plutonium. The core was compressed to prompt super-criticality by the implosion generated by the high explosive lens. This design became known as a "Christy Core" or "Christy pit" after physicist Robert F. Christy, who made the solid pit design a reality after it was initially proposed by Edward Teller. Along with the pit, the whole physics package was also informally nicknamed "Christy['s] Gadget".

Of the several allotropes of plutonium, the metallurgists preferred the malleable δ (delta) phase. This was stabilized at room temperature by alloying it with gallium. Two equal hemispheres of plutonium-gallium alloy were plated with silver, and designated by serial numbers HS-1 and HS-2. The Trinity core consisted of just these two hemispheres. Later cores also included a ring with a triangular cross-section to prevent jets forming in the gap between them.

A trial assembly of the Gadget without the active components or explosive lenses was carried out by the bomb assembly team headed by Norris Bradbury at Los Alamos on July 3. It was driven to Trinity and back. A set of explosive lenses arrived on July 7, followed by a second set on July 10. Each was examined by Bradbury and Kistiakowsky, and the best ones were selected for use. The remainder were handed over to Edward Creutz, who conducted a test detonation at Pajarito Canyon near Los Alamos without nuclear material. This test brought bad news: magnetic measurements of the simultaneity of the implosion seemed to indicate that the Trinity test would fail. Bethe worked through the night to assess the results and reported that they were consistent with a perfect explosion.

Assembly of the nuclear capsule began on July 13 at the McDonald Ranch House, where the master bedroom had been turned into a clean room. The polonium-beryllium "Urchin" initiator was assembled, and Louis Slotin placed it inside the two hemispheres of the plutonium core. Cyril Smith then placed the core in the natural uranium tamper plug, or "slug". Air gaps were filled with  gold foil, and the two halves of the plug were held together with uranium washers and screws which fit smoothly into the domed ends of the plug. The completed capsule was then driven to the base of the tower.

At the tower, a temporary eye bolt was screwed into the  capsule and a chain hoist was used to lower the capsule into the gadget. As the capsule entered the hole in the uranium tamper, it stuck. Robert Bacher realized that the heat from the plutonium core had caused the capsule to expand, while the explosives assembly with the tamper had cooled during the night in the desert. By leaving the capsule in contact with the tamper, the temperatures equalized and, in a few minutes, the capsule had slipped completely into the tamper. The eye bolt was then removed from the capsule and replaced with a threaded uranium plug, a boron disk was placed on top of the capsule, an aluminum plug was screwed into the hole in the pusher, and the two remaining high explosive lenses were installed. Finally, the upper Dural polar cap was bolted into place. Assembly was completed at about 16:45 on July 13.

The Gadget was hoisted to the top of a  steel tower. The height would give a better indication of how the weapon would behave when dropped from a bomber, as detonation in the air would maximize the amount of energy applied directly to the target (as the explosion expanded in a spherical shape) and would generate less nuclear fallout. The tower stood on four legs that went  into the ground, with concrete footings. Atop it was an oak platform, and a shack made of corrugated iron that was open on the western side. The Gadget was hauled up with an electric winch. A truckload of mattresses was placed underneath in case the cable broke and the Gadget fell. The seven-man arming party, consisting of Bainbridge, Kistiakowsky, Joseph McKibben and four soldiers including Lieutenant Bush, drove out to the tower to perform the final arming shortly after 22:00 on July 15.

Personnel

In the final two weeks before the test, some 250 personnel from Los Alamos were at work at the Trinity site, and Lieutenant Bush's command had ballooned to 125 men guarding and maintaining the base camp. Another 160 men under Major T.O. Palmer were stationed outside the area with vehicles to evacuate the civilian population in the surrounding region should that prove necessary. They had enough vehicles to move 450 people to safety and had food and supplies to last them for two days. Arrangements were made for Alamogordo Army Air Field to provide accommodation. Groves had warned the Governor of New Mexico, John J. Dempsey, that martial law might have to be declared in the southwestern part of the state.

Shelters were established  due north, west, and south of the tower, known as N-10,000, W-10,000 and S-10,000. Each had its own shelter chief: Robert Wilson at N-10,000, John Manley at W-10,000 and Frank Oppenheimer at S-10,000. Richard Feynman claimed to be the only person to see the explosion without the goggles provided, relying on a truck windshield to screen out harmful ultraviolet wavelengths.

Bainbridge asked Groves to keep his VIP list down to just ten. He chose himself, Oppenheimer, Richard Tolman, Vannevar Bush, James Conant, Brigadier General Thomas F. Farrell, Charles Lauritsen, Isidor Isaac Rabi, Sir Geoffrey Taylor, and Sir James Chadwick. The observers set up a betting pool on the results of the test. Edward Teller was the most optimistic, predicting . He wore gloves to protect his hands, and sunglasses underneath the welding goggles that the government had supplied everyone with. Teller was also one of the few scientists to actually watch the test (with eye protection), instead of following orders to lie on the ground with his back turned. He also brought suntan lotion, which he shared with the others.

Others were less optimistic. Ramsey chose zero (a complete dud), Robert Oppenheimer chose , Kistiakowsky , and Bethe chose . Rabi, the last to arrive, took  by default, which would win him the pool. In a video interview, Bethe stated that his choice of 8 kt was exactly the value calculated by Segrè, and he was swayed by Segrè's authority over that of a more junior [but unnamed] member of Segrè's group who had calculated 20 kt. Enrico Fermi offered to take wagers among the top physicists and military present on whether the atmosphere would ignite, and if so whether it would destroy just the state, or incinerate the entire planet. This last result had been previously calculated by Bethe to be almost impossible, although for a while it had caused some of the scientists some anxiety. Bainbridge was furious with Fermi for scaring the guards who, unlike the physicists, did not have the advantage of their knowledge about the scientific possibilities (some GIs had asked to be relieved from manning their stations). His own biggest fear was that nothing would happen, in which case he would have to head back to the tower to investigate.

Julian Mack and Berlyn Brixner were responsible for photography. The photography group employed some fifty different cameras, taking motion and still photographs. Special Fastax cameras taking 10,000 frames per second would record the minute details of the explosion. Spectrograph cameras would record the wavelengths of light emitted by the explosion, and pinhole cameras would record gamma rays. A rotating drum spectrograph at the  station would obtain the spectrum over the first hundredth of a second. Another, slow recording one would track the fireball. Cameras were placed in bunkers only  from the tower, protected by steel and lead glass, and mounted on sleds so they could be towed out by the lead-lined tank. Some observers brought their own cameras despite the security. Segrè brought in Jack Aeby with his 35 mm Perfex 44. He would take the only known well-exposed color photograph of the detonation explosion.

Explosion

Detonation

The scientists wanted good visibility, low humidity, light winds at low altitude, and westerly winds at high altitude for the test. The best weather was predicted between July 18 and 21, but the Potsdam Conference was due to start on July 16 and President Harry S. Truman wanted the test to be conducted before the conference began. It was therefore scheduled for July 16, the earliest date at which the bomb components would be available.

The detonation was initially planned for 04:00 MWT but was postponed because of rain and lightning from early that morning. It was feared that the danger from radiation and fallout would be increased by rain, and lightning had the scientists concerned about a premature detonation. A crucial favorable weather report came in at 04:45, and the final twenty-minute countdown began at 05:10, read by Samuel Allison. By 05:30 the rain had gone. There were some communication problems. The shortwave radio frequency for communicating with the B-29s was shared with the Voice of America, and the FM radios shared a frequency with a railroad freight yard in San Antonio, Texas.

Two circling B-29s observed the test, with Shields again flying the lead plane. They carried members of Project Alberta, who would carry out airborne measurements during the atomic missions. These included Captain Deak Parsons, the Associate Director of the Los Alamos Laboratory and the head of Project Alberta; Luis Alvarez, Harold Agnew, Bernard Waldman, Wolfgang Panofsky, and William Penney. The overcast sky obscured their view of the test site.

The desert sand, largely made of silica, melted and became a mildly radioactive light green glass, which was named trinitite. At the time of detonation, the surrounding mountains were illuminated "brighter than daytime" for one to two seconds, and the heat was reported as "being as hot as an oven" at the base camp. The observed colors of the illumination changed from purple to green and eventually to white. The roar of the shock wave took 40 seconds to reach the observers.

Ralph Carlisle Smith, watching from Compania Hill, wrote:

In his official report on the test, Farrell (who initially exclaimed, "The long-hairs have let it get away from them!") wrote: 

William L. Laurence of The New York Times had been transferred temporarily to the Manhattan Project at Groves's request in early 1945. Groves had arranged for Laurence to view significant events, including Trinity and the atomic bombing of Japan. Laurence wrote press releases with the help of the Manhattan Project's public relations staff. He later recalled that 

After the initial euphoria of witnessing the explosion had passed, Bainbridge told Oppenheimer, "Now we are all sons of bitches." Rabi noticed Oppenheimer's reaction: "I'll never forget his walk"; Rabi recalled, "I'll never forget the way he stepped out of the car ... his walk was like High Noon ... this kind of strut. He had done it."

Oppenheimer later recalled that, while witnessing the explosion, he thought of a verse from a Hindu holy book, the Bhagavad Gita (XI,12):

Years later he would explain that another verse had also entered his head at that time:

"My first impression was, like, the sun was coming up in the south. What a ball of fire! It was so bright it lit up the cockpit of the plane." Lugo radioed Albuquerque. He got no explanation for the blast but was told, "Don't fly south."

Energy measurements

Immediately after the blast, the two lead-lined Sherman tanks made their way to the crater.

Fifty beryllium-copper diaphragm microphones were also used to record the pressure of the blast wave. These were supplemented by mechanical pressure gauges. These indicated a blast energy of  ± , with only one of the mechanical pressure gauges working correctly that indicated .

Fermi prepared his own experiment to measure the energy that was released as blast. He later recalled that:

There were also several gamma ray and neutron detectors; few survived the blast, with all the gauges within  of ground zero being destroyed, but sufficient data were recovered to measure the gamma ray component of the ionizing radiation released.

The final Nagasaki burst height was  so the Mach stem started sooner. The knowledge that implosion worked led Oppenheimer to recommend to Groves that the uranium-235 used in a Little Boy gun-type weapon could be used more economically in a composite core with plutonium. It was too late to do this with the first Little Boy, but the composite cores would soon enter production.

Civilian detection
Civilians noticed the bright lights and huge explosion. Groves, therefore, had the Second Air Force issue a press release with a cover story that he had prepared weeks before: 

The press release was written by Laurence. He had prepared four releases, covering outcomes ranging from an account of a successful test (the one which was used) to catastrophic scenarios involving serious damage to surrounding communities, evacuation of nearby residents, and a placeholder for the names of those killed. As Laurence was a witness to the test he knew that the last release, if used, might be his own obituary. A newspaper article published the same day stated that "the blast was seen and felt throughout an area extending from El Paso to Silver City, Gallup, Socorro, and Albuquerque." The articles appeared in New Mexico, but East Coast newspapers ignored them.

Information about the Trinity test was made public shortly after the bombing of Hiroshima. The Smyth Report, released on August 12, 1945, gave some information on the blast, and the edition released by Princeton University Press a few weeks later incorporated the War Department's press release on the test as Appendix 6, and contained the famous pictures of a "bulbous" Trinity fireball. Groves, Oppenheimer and other dignitaries visited the test site in September 1945, wearing white canvas overshoes to prevent fallout from sticking to the soles of their shoes.

Official notifications
The results of the test were conveyed to the Secretary of War Henry L. Stimson at the Potsdam Conference in Germany in a coded message from his assistant George L. Harrison:

The message arrived at the "Little White House" in the Potsdam suburb of Babelsberg and was at once taken to Truman and Secretary of State James F. Byrnes. Harrison sent a follow-up message which arrived on the morning of July 18:

Fallout
Film badges used to measure exposure to radioactivity indicated that no observers at N-10,000 had been exposed to more than 0.1 roentgens (half of the National Council on Radiation Protection and Measurements recommended daily radiation exposure limit), but the shelter was evacuated before the radioactive cloud could reach it. The explosion was more efficient than expected and the thermal updraft drew most of the cloud high enough that little fallout fell on the test site. The crater was far more radioactive than expected due to the formation of trinitite, and the crews of the two lead-lined Sherman tanks were subjected to considerable exposure. Anderson's dosimeter and film badge recorded 7 to 10 roentgens, and one of the tank drivers, who made three trips, recorded 13 to 15 roentgens.

The fallout there was reported to have settled in a white mist onto some of the livestock in the area, resulting in local beta burns and a temporary loss of dorsal or back hair. Patches of hair grew back discolored white. The Army bought 88 cattle in all from ranchers; the 17 most significantly marked were kept at Los Alamos, while the rest were shipped to Oak Ridge for long-term observation. Dose reconstruction published on September 1, 2020, by researchers working under the auspices of the National Cancer Institute documented that five counties in New Mexico experienced the greatest radioactive contamination: Guadalupe, Lincoln, San Miguel, Socorro, and Torrance.

In August 1945, shortly after the bombing of Hiroshima, the Kodak Company observed spotting and fogging on their film, which was at that time usually packaged in cardboard containers. J. H. Webb, an employee of the Kodak Company, studied the matter and concluded that the contamination must have come from a nuclear explosion somewhere in the United States. He discounted the possibility that the Hiroshima bomb was responsible, due to the timing of the events. A hot spot of fallout contaminated the river water that a paper mill in Indiana used to manufacture the cardboard pulp from corn husks. Aware of the gravity of his discovery, Webb kept this secret until 1949.

This incident, along with the next continental US tests in 1951, set a precedent. In subsequent atmospheric nuclear tests at the Nevada test site, United States Atomic Energy Commission officials gave the photographic industry maps and forecasts of potential contamination, as well as expected fallout distributions, which enabled them to purchase uncontaminated materials and take other protective measures.

Site today

In September 1953, about 650 people attended the first Trinity Site open house. Visitors to a Trinity Site open house are allowed to see the ground zero and McDonald Ranch House areas. More than seventy years after the test, residual radiation at the site was about ten times higher than normal background radiation in the area. The amount of radioactive exposure received during a one-hour visit to the site is about half of the total radiation exposure which a U.S. adult receives on an average day from natural and medical sources.

On December 21, 1965, the  Trinity Site was declared a National Historic Landmark district, and on October 15, 1966, was listed on the National Register of Historic Places. The landmark includes the base camp where the scientists and support group lived, ground zero where the bomb was placed for the explosion, and the McDonald ranch house, where the plutonium core to the bomb was assembled. One of the old instrumentation bunkers is visible beside the road just west of ground zero. An inner oblong fence was added in 1967, and the corridor barbed wire fence that connects the outer fence to the inner one was completed in 1972. 

A special tour of the site was conducted on July 16, 1995, to mark the 50th anniversary of the Trinity test. About 5,000 visitors arrived to commemorate the occasion, the largest crowd for any open house. Since then, the open houses have usually averaged two to three thousand visitors. The site is still a popular destination for those interested in atomic tourism, though it is only open to the public twice a year during the Trinity Site Open House on the first Saturdays of April and October. In 2014, the White Sands Missile Range announced that due to budgetary constraints, the site would only be open once a year, on the first Saturday in April. In 2015, this decision was reversed, and two events were scheduled, in April and October. The base commander, Brigadier General Timothy R. Coffin, explained that:

Gallery

Notes

Citations

References

External links

 "The Trinity test" a 2020 article by Virginia Grant published in National Security Science magazine
 Trinity Remembered: 60th Anniversary
 The Trinity test on the Sandia National Laboratories website
 Trinity Test Fallout Pattern
 Trinity Test Photographs
 "My Radioactive Vacation", report of a visit to the Trinity site, with pictures comparing its past with its present state
 Visiting Trinity Short article by Ker Than at 3 Quarks Daily
 "War Department release on New Mexico test, July 16, 1945", from the Smyth Report, with eyewitness reports from Groves and Farrell (1945)
 
 
 Trinity's cloud (1945), photographs of mushroom cloud
 Video of the site, original blast, and the ranch where the bomb was assembled from 2017
 
 

Explosions in 1945
1945 in military history
1945 in New Mexico
1945 in science
1945 in the United States
July 1945 events in the United States
American nuclear weapons testing
Articles containing video clips
Atomic tourism
Code names
Explosions in the United States
Historic districts on the National Register of Historic Places in New Mexico
History of New Mexico
History of Socorro County, New Mexico
History of the Manhattan Project
Military facilities on the National Register of Historic Places in New Mexico
Military history of New Mexico
National Historic Landmarks in New Mexico
National Register of Historic Places in Socorro County, New Mexico
New Mexico State Register of Cultural Properties
Tourist attractions in Alamogordo, New Mexico
Tourist attractions in Socorro County, New Mexico
Tularosa Basin
World War II on the National Register of Historic Places